Harald Fairhair's campaign in Götaland was an attack that took place in the 870s.

Snorri Sturluson writes in Harald Fairhair's saga that Harald Fairhair disputed the Swedish king Eric Eymundsson's hegemony in what is today southern Norway.

He attacked and forced Viken to accept his rule and then plundered and burnt in Rånrike. Because of this the Norwegian skald Þorbjörn hornklofi boasted that the Swedes stayed indoors whereas the Norwegians were out on the sea.

The Gauts (Geats) did not accept this and assembled their forces. In the spring, they put stakes in Göta älv to stop Harald's ships. Harald Fairhair put his ships alongside the stakes and plundered and burnt everything he could reach.
The Norwegian skald said of this:

The Geats arrived to the ships with a great army to fight king Harald, but they lost after great losses.

Then the Norwegians travelled far and wide in Götaland, winning most of the battles. In one of the battles, the Geatish commander Hrani the Geat fell. Harald then proclaimed himself the ruler of all land north of Göta älv and north and west of lake Vänern and placed Guttorm Haraldsson to defend the region with a large force.

References
 Sturluson, Snorri. Heimskringla: History of the Kings of Norway, translated Lee M. Hollander. Reprinted University of Texas Press, Austin, 1992. 

Battles involving Norway
Battles involving the Vikings
G
Geats
Battles involving Sweden
Götaland
870s conflicts
9th century in Norway
Harald Fairhair